Blue School District 22  is a school district in the community of Blue, in Greenlee County, Arizona. The school covers grades K-12. The school, Blue School, is nicknamed "the Blue".

The previous building was a wooden one room school, painted in red and white. In 1984 the school had four students, with one girl. Randy Collier of The Arizona Republic stated due to difficulties in transportation and from being far from other places, "the social life at Blue primarily is at the school." Lightning ruined the wooden building in 1985, so a new one was built. Previously it was a K-8 school; in that era students attended Round Valley Unified School District's Round Valley High School in Eagar, with some living with relatives in Eagar and some traveling to and from Eagar via school bus. In 2021 the enrollment was 10 and the school now covered high school.

Operations
According to the teacher, the students in upper grades assist students in prior grades. Kim Smith of the Eastern Arizona Courier wrote that Blue School "blend real-life experiences into the curriculum."

See also
 Non-high school district

References

External links

 Information from the superintendent of schools - Greenlee County

School districts in Greenlee County, Arizona
One-room schoolhouses in Arizona